Ville-sur-Haine is a village of Wallonia and a district of the municipality of Le Rœulx, located in the province of Hainaut, Belgium.

George Lawrence Price 

Canadian private George Lawrence Price, known as the last soldier of the British Empire to be killed in the First World War, was shot and killed by a German sniper at Ville-sur-Haine just two minutes before the armistice went into effect. A memorial plaque marks the location.

A plebiscite was held and on 11 November of that year the bridge was officially named the George Price Footbridge.

On April 24, 2015, l’école communale de Ville-sur-Haine was renamed École George Price.

On November 10, 2018, Canadian Governor General Julie Payette and other dignitaries, attended the inauguration of a tear drop shaped monument in honour of Private Price, located in Ville-sur-Haine.

References 

Former municipalities of Hainaut (province)